Considine is an Irish surname anglicised from the Gaelic form Mac Consaidín meaning "son of Consaidín" being derived from a foreign Christian name; meaning "son of Constantine". The family were based in Kingdom of Thomond, much of which later became County Clare. The ancestor of the family was Consaidín Ua Briain, a Bishop of Killaloe who died in 1194 and who was the son of Toirdhealbhach mac Diarmada Ua Briain. Notable people with the surname include:

 A family prominent in American entertainment:
 John Considine (Seattle), pioneering vaudeville impresario, producer of 48 movies (1925–1943)
 His son Bob Considine, political reporter and newspaper columnist
 Grandson John Considine (III), an actor
 Grandson Tim Considine, also an actor

Other people with this name are:
 Andrew Considine, a Scottish footballer with Aberdeen FC
 Basil Considine, American opera composer and music journalist
 Dave Considine, American state representative from Wisconsin
 Hubert D. Considine (1919–2019) American politician and businessman
 Ciara Considine, Celtic musician from England
 J. D. Considine, American music journalist
 John J. Considine, American politician
 Michael Considine, Australian politician
 Michael Considine (poet), author of the Irish folk song "Spancill Hill"
 Paddy Considine, British actor
 Seán Considine, defensive back for the Philadelphia Eagles, Baltimore Ravens (Super Bowl XLVII champions), and Jacksonville Jaguars
 Steve Considine, American meteorologist
 Ulick Considine (1901–1950), English cricketer
 Ailish Considine Australian rules footballer for the Adelaide Crows.
 Eimear Considine Irish Rugby player and presenter for Eir Sport and TG4
 Katie Considine Clare ladies footballer

References

Septs of the Dál gCais
Anglicised Irish-language surnames
Surnames of Irish origin